Terra is the third studio album by Finnish pop singer Jenni Vartiainen.

Track listing

Charts and certifications

Charts

Certifications

Release history

See also
List of number-one albums of 2013 (Finland)

References

2013 albums
Jenni Vartiainen albums
Finnish-language albums